David John Dodds (born 1930, in Sunderland, County Durham, in North East England) was a marathoner and jockey. He died in Sunderland on June 4, 2021.

In his late teens and early twenties (having trained as a fitter and turner, losing two of his fingers in the process) he became a well-known figure in local athletics before emigrating to Southern Rhodesia in 1954.

The following year he participated in the South African Marathon Championships and came second to Jan Barnard. Moreover, he ran in the gruelling Comrades Marathon, a  event between the cities of Pietermaritzburg and Durban, and came fourth of 92 entrants. Dodds' time was 6 hours, 25 minutes and 15 seconds and he won the novices' trophy, an award given to the fastest first time entrant. Of the race he commented: "The downhills bothered me more than the uphills. My legs became so jarred that I thought I would not be able to finish."

Dodds later gave up athletics - having participated in the 1958 British Empire and Commonwealth Games - and became a successful amateur jockey. He won over 50 races, including the Rhodesian Grand National in 1965 when he rode Tempelhof, owned by Sir Henry Grattan-Bellew. In 1974 he returned to Sunderland, accompanied by his wife Natalie (née Crampton) and three sons. Later he divided his time between Sunderland and a residence near Alicante, Spain.

References

1930 births
Living people
British ultramarathon runners
Athletes (track and field) at the 1958 British Empire and Commonwealth Games
Sportspeople from Sunderland
English male marathon runners
Male ultramarathon runners
Commonwealth Games competitors for Southern Rhodesia